Deformation can refer to:

 Deformation (engineering), changes in an object's shape or form due to the application of a force or forces.
 Deformation (physics), such changes considered and analyzed as displacements of continuum bodies.
 Deformation (meteorology), a measure of the rate at which the shapes of clouds and other fluid bodies change.
 Deformation (mathematics), the study of conditions leading to slightly different solutions of mathematical equations, models and problems.
 Deformation (volcanology), a measure of the rate at which the shapes of volcanoes change.
 Deformation (biology), a harmful mutation or other deformation in an organism.

See also 
 Deformity (medicine), a major difference in the shape of a body part or organ compared to its common or average shape.
 Plasticity (physics), the study of the non-reversible deformation of materials subjected to forces.
 Super-deformed, or the chibi style of art associated with anime and manga